The 1951 Stanford Indians football team represented Stanford University in the 1951 college football season. Stanford was led by first-year head coach Chuck Taylor.  The team was a member of the Pacific Coast Conference and played their home games at Stanford Stadium in Stanford, California.

Coaching change
The 1950 season had ended in disappointing fashion after high expectations and a fast start. Head coach Marchmont Schwartz had resigned following the season, and to replace him, Stanford hired Chuck Taylor, a former Stanford All-American guard and member of Stanford's undefeated 1940 team which defeated Nebraska in the 1941 Rose Bowl.

Season summary
Led by the passing attack of senior quarterback Gary Kerkorian and senior end Bill McColl, Stanford ran out to a 9–0 start and took a #3 ranking into the Big Game, where they were 13-point favorites over rival California. Cal upset the Indians 20–7, but as PCC champions, Stanford was invited to the 1952 Rose Bowl against Big Ten champion and 4th-ranked Illinois. The Indians led at halftime 7–6 and trailed only 13–7 to start the fourth quarter, but a 27-point scoring outburst gave the Fighting Illini a convincing 40–7 victory.

Schedule

Aftermath
Taylor, at 31 the youngest major college football coach, was named AFCA Coach of the Year, the only time a Stanford coach has received the award. In addition to numerous awards, McColl was a Consensus All-American, finished fourth in the voting for the Heisman Trophy, and would go on to a seven-year professional career with the Chicago Bears. Kerkorian was drafted by the Pittsburgh Steelers and backed up Johnny Unitas with the Baltimore Colts.

Players drafted by the NFL

References

Stanford
Stanford Cardinal football seasons
Pac-12 Conference football champion seasons
Stanford Indians football